Tom Vitoín is a fictional character from the Portuguese comic strip "As Odisseias de um Motard" (The Odysseys of a Biker) by Luis Pinto-Coelho, published in the Portuguese Motociclismo magazine since 1992.

In the strips, Tom Vitoín and his friends experience all sorts of situations and adventures every-day riders encounter often in real life.

The surname Vitoín is inspired by the V-twin engines designation.
In the first years, Tom Vitoín had a Yamaha FJ1200 motorcycle. Then he changed it for a Triumph Trophy-4. In 2018, Tom Vitoín bought a Honda Africa Twin.

Albums
Apart from the monthly publications in the magazine Motociclismo five compilations were already published. 
Also, two original albums, written by the Portuguese female driver Elisabete Jacinto, were released, based on Portuguese attendance at Paris-Dakar Rally.

 As Odisseias de um Motard (1996)
 As Odisseias de um Motard nº2 (1999)
 As Odisseias de um Motard nº3 (2003)
 As Odisseias de um Motard nº4 (2007)
 As Odisseias de um Motard nº5 (2011)
 Os Portugas no Dakar vol.1 (2003)
 Os Portugas no Dakar vol.2 (2007)

References

External links
 Tom Vitoín, Andar de Moto
 Motociclismo Portugal (Magazine) official website
 As Odisseias de um Motard nº5 release

Portuguese comics
Vitoin, Tom
1992 comics debuts
Vitoin, Tom
Humor comics